The John and Ella Morrill House is a historic house located at 95 North Main Street in Junction, Utah.

Description and history 
Completed in 1895 and built by John Morrill, the two-story house is prominently located at the northeast corner of the central block of Main Street in Junction. It is significant as "a unique example of the Victorian Gothic style" in Junction.

It was listed on the National Register of Historic Places on April 7, 1994.

References

Houses on the National Register of Historic Places in Utah
Gothic Revival architecture in Utah
Houses completed in 1895
Houses in Piute County, Utah
National Register of Historic Places in Piute County, Utah